A gigabit interface converter (GBIC) is a standard for transceivers, first defined in 1995 and commonly used with Gigabit Ethernet and Fibre Channel for some time. By offering a standard, hot swappable electrical interface, a single gigabit port can support a wide range of physical media, from copper to long-wave single-mode optical fiber, at lengths of hundreds of kilometers.

A smaller variation of the GBIC called the small form-factor pluggable transceiver (SFP), also known as mini-GBIC, has the same functionality but in a smaller form factor. Announced in 2001, it largely made the GBIC obsolete.

Appeal
The appeal of the GBIC standard (and hot-swappable transceivers in general) in networking equipment, as opposed to fixed physical interface configurations, is its flexibility. Where multiple different optical technologies are in use, an administrator can purchase GBICs as needed, not in advance, and they can be the specific type needed for each link. This lowers the cost of the base system and gives the administrator far more flexibility. On the other hand, if a switch will mostly have one port type (especially if that port type is copper) purchasing a switch with that port type built in will be cheaper and take up less space per port.

Standards
The GBIC standard is non-proprietary and is defined by the Small Form Factor committee in document number 8053i. The first publication of the proposal was in November 1995. A few corrections and additions were made through September 2000. Robert Snively of Brocade Communications was technical editor. Original contributors were AMP Incorporated, Compaq Computers, Sun Microsystems, and Vixel Corporation.

References

Hot-swappable transceiver